Jack Goodman (born 21 March 2005) is an English professional footballer who plays as a forward for  club Stamford, on loan from  club Doncaster Rovers.

Career
Goodman graduated from The Holgate Academy. He joined Notts County at under-8 level, but dropped out at under-13 level to play with Hucknall Sports. He rejoined Notts County in 2021, but elected to take up a scholarship at Doncaster Rovers. He made his first-team debut at the age of sixteen, having come on as an 87th-minute substitute for Joe Dodoo in a 3–2 win at Scunthorpe United in the EFL Trophy; this made him the seventh youngest person in history to play for the club. He scored eighteen goals for the youth-team in the 2021–22 campaign and scored five goals in one afternoon in July 2022. He made his first-team debut at the Eco-Power Stadium on 9 August 2022, in a 3–0 defeat to Lincoln City in the EFL Cup; manager Gary McSheffrey said Goodman was "the positive for the night". On 26 December 2022, he joined Stamford of the Northern Premier League Division One Midlands on loan.

Career statistics

References

2005 births
Living people
English footballers
Association football forwards
Notts County F.C. players
Doncaster Rovers F.C. players
Stamford A.F.C. players
English Football League players
Northern Premier League players